Eupithecia minimaria is a moth in the family Geometridae first described by Turati in 1927. It is found in Libya.

References

Moths described in 1927
minimaria
Moths of Africa